Andrew Wee is a professor of physics at the National University of Singapore.

References

External links
NUS Bio

Year of birth missing (living people)
Living people
Singaporean Rhodes Scholars
Place of birth missing (living people)
Academic staff of the National University of Singapore